"Arise, O Compatriots" is the national anthem of Nigeria. It was adopted in the late 1970s and is the country's second national anthem.

History
The anthem was adopted in 1978 and replaced the previous national anthem, "Nigeria, We Hail Thee".

The lyrics are a combination of words and phrases taken from five of the best entries in a national contest. The words were put to music by the Nigerian Police Band under the directorship of Benedict P. Odiase (1934–2013). The Nigerian national anthem lyrics were created by five people: P. O. Aderibigbe, John A. Ilechukwu, Dr. Sota Omoigui, Eme tim Akpan and B.A. Ogunnaike.

Lyrics
Although the anthem has two verses, usually only the first is sung. On some occasions, the second verse is recited as "The National Prayer".

National Pledge
The Nigerian pledge of allegiance is recited immediately after the playing of the Nigerian national anthem. It was written by Felicia Adebola Adeyoyin in 1976.

Notes

References 

African anthems
Nigerian songs
National symbols of Nigeria
National anthem compositions in F major